The list below is split between telescopes located in Australia, and telescopes sponsored by Australia such as a space telescope or foreign installation.

Australia can access the Southern skies, which was a popular trend in the 20th century (many telescope had been built for the northern hemisphere). The third largest optical telescope in the world in 1974 was Anglo-Australian Telescope, one of the really large telescopes of that time and built in Australia. There are several radio telescopes also, and Sydney Observatory has taken observations for over a century.

One of the largest telescopes of the 19th century was the Great Melbourne Telescope, one of the last big metal mirror reflecting telescopes before the silver-on-glass designs came to predominate; this was purchased with money from an Australian Gold boom.

In country optical telescopes
Anglo-Australian Telescope (3.9m, 1974-)
Automated Patrol Telescope (.5m, 1989-2008)
Faulkes Telescope South (2m, 2004-)
SkyMapper (1.35m)
UTas H127 (1.27m)
Great Melbourne Telescope (48 inches/ ~1.22m, 1868)
Siding Spring 2.3 m Telescope (2.3 m)
Sydney Observatory instruments
Penrith Observatory (0.6m)
Uppsala Southern Schmidt Telescope (0.5m)
Perth-Lowell Telescope (0.6m)

Radio telescopes
See List_of_radio_telescopes#Australia

See also
Lists of telescopes
List of largest optical telescopes in the British Isles
List of largest optical telescopes in the North America

External links
10 of the best Australian observatories

Astronomy in Australia
Lists of telescopes